Senator Littlefield may refer to:

Alfred H. Littlefield (1829–1893), Rhode Island State Senate
Nathaniel Littlefield (1804–1882), Maine State Senate
Rick Littlefield (born 1952), Oklahoma State Senate